Hobro is an old market and railway town in Region Nordjylland on the Jutland peninsula in northern Denmark. It has a population of 12,071 (1 January 2022). The town is situated in a hilly terrain at the head of Mariager Fjord, close to the former Viking fortress of Fyrkat. It is the seat of Mariagerfjord municipality.

Politics
Hobro was until 1 January 2007 also a municipality (Danish, kommune) in North Jutland County covering an area of 166 km² and with a total population of 15,318 (2005).  Its last mayor was Jørgen Pontoppidan, a member of the Venstre (Liberal Party) political party.

Hobro municipality ceased to exist due to Kommunalreformen ("The Municipality Reform" of 2007).  It was merged with  Arden, Hadsund, and Mariager municipalities to form the new Mariagerfjord municipality.  This created a municipality with an area of 769 km² and a total population of 43,049 (2005).   The new municipality belongs to Region Nordjylland ("North Jutland Region").

Sport
Hobro IK are a football club based in Hobro who currently play in the Danish First Division.

Transportation

Rail

Hobro is served by Hobro railway station. It is located on the Randers-Aalborg railway line and offers direct InterCity services to Copenhagen and Aalborg and regional train services to Aarhus and Aalborg.

Notable people
 Thora Daugaard (1874 in Store Arden near Hobro – 1951) a women's rights activist, pacifist, editor and translator
 Ingeborg Brams (1921 in Hobro - 1989) a Danish film, radio, TV and theatre actress 
 Bent Norup (1936 in Hobro – 2007), operatic heldenbaritone
 Matias Faldbakken (born 1973 in Hobro) a Norwegian artist and writer
 Mads Nissen (born 1979 in Hobro) a documentary photographer, won 2015 World Press Photo of the Year

Sport 
 Gert Frank (born 1956 in Hobro) a former cyclist, team bronze medallist at the 1976 Summer Olympics 
 Tom Kristensen (born 1967 in Hobro) a racing driver 
 Michael V. Knudsen (born 1978 in Hobro) a handball player
 Martin Thomsen (born 1982 in Hobro) a Danish footballer, over 350 caps, mainly for Skive IK
 Fie Udby Erichsen (born 1985 in Hobro) a rower and silver medalist in the women's single sculls at the 2012 Summer Olympics
 Michael Færk Christensen (born 1986 in Hobro), a racing cyclist

References

External links
 Mariagerfjord municipality's official website 

Municipal seats of the North Jutland Region
Cities and towns in the North Jutland Region
Former municipalities of Denmark
Mariagerfjord Municipality